The Cuiabá Film and Video Festival is a national Brazilian film and video festival held in Cuiabá that exhibits audiovisual productions from Brazil and Latin America. It was first held in 1992 and had its 19th edition in 2014.

References

External links 
 

Film festivals in Brazil
Cuiabá